The following is a non-exhaustive list of links to specific religious texts which may be used for further, more in-depth study.

Bronze Age

Ancient Egyptian religion 

 Pyramid Texts
 Coffin Texts
 Book of the Dead
 Book of Caverns
 Book of Gates
 Amduat
 Book of the Heavenly Cow
 Litany of Re
 Atenism: Great Hymn to the Aten

Sumerian religion 

 Hymn to Enlil
 Kesh Temple Hymn
 Song of the hoe
 Debate between Winter and Summer
 Epic of Gilgamesh
 Epic of Enmerkar
 Enmerkar and the Lord of Aratta
 Enmerkar and En-suhgir-ana
 Epic of Lugalbanda
 Lugalbanda in the Mountain Cave
 Lugalbanda and the Anzud Bird
 Angim
 Enki and the World Order
 Enlil and Ninlil
 Enlil and Namzitara
 Inanna and Utu
 Inanna Prefers the Farmer
 Inanna and Enki
 Inanna Takes Command of Heaven
 Inanna and Ebih
 Inanna and Shukaletuda
 Inanna and Bilulu
 Inanna's Descent into the Underworld
 Ninurta's Journey to Eridu

Babylonian religion 

 Enūma Eliš
 Epic of Gilgamesh
 Agushaya Hymn
 Atra-Hasis
 Labbu myth
 Nergal and Ereshkigal
 Epic of Erra
 Enmesharra's Defeat
 Anzû and the Tablet of Destinies

Canaanite religion 

 Baal Cycle
 Legend of Keret
 Tale of Aqhat

Classical antiquity

Etruscan religion 

 Liber Linteus
 Pyrgi Tablets

Ancient Greek religion 

 Aretalogy
 Argonautica
 Bibliotheca
 Derveni papyrus
 Ehoiai
 Homeric Hymns
 Iliad
 Odyssey
 Telegony
 The golden verses of Pythagoras
 Delphic maxims
 Theogony
 Works and Days
 Epic Cycle
 Theban Cycle

Hermeticism 

 Hermetica
 Kybalion
 Emerald Tablet
 Asclepius

Mandaeism 

Main texts:
Ginza Rabba
Right Ginza
Left Ginza
Mandaean Book of John
Qolasta

Ritual texts:
The Wedding of the Great Shishlam
Scroll of the Parwanaya
Scroll of the Great Baptism
Scroll of the Ancestors
Zihrun Raza Kasia

Esoteric texts:
The Thousand and Twelve Questions
Scroll of Exalted Kingship
The Coronation of the Great Shishlam
Alma Rišaia Rba
Alma Rišaia Zuṭa
The Baptism of Hibil Ziwa
Scroll of Abatur
Dmut Kušṭa
Secrets of the Ancestors
Scroll of the Rivers
Book of the Zodiac

Historical texts:
Haran Gawaita

Others:
Incantation bowls
Lead rolls

Manichaeism 

Gospel of Mani
Treasure of Life
Pragmateia
The Book of Giants
Fundamental Epistle
Manichaean Psalter
Shabuhragan
Arzhang
Kephalaia, found in Coptic translation.

Orphism 

 Orphic poems

East Asian religions

Confucianism 

The Four Books and Five Classics:
 The Five Classics (I Ching, Book of Documents, Classic of Poetry, Book of Rites, Spring and Autumn Annals) 
 The Four Books (Great Learning, Doctrine of the Mean, Analects, Mencius)
The Thirteen Classics (I Ching, Book of Documents, Classic of Poetry, Rites of Zhou, Etiquette and Ceremonial, Book of Rites, The Commentary of Zuo, The Commentary of Gongyang, The Commentary of Guliang, The Analects, Classic of Filial Piety, Erya, Mencius)

Taoism 

 , meaning "Taoist Canon", consists of around 1,400 texts that were collected to bring together all of the teachings of Taoism.
 
 
 
 
 
 
 
 
 
 
 List of Lingbao texts
 
 
 
 
 Holy Emperor Guan's True Scripture to Awaken the World
 Treatise On the Response of the Tao

Shinto 

 The 
 The 
 The 
 The

Iranian religions

Zoroastrianism 

Primary religious texts (the Avesta collection):
 The Yasna, the primary liturgical collection, includes the Gathas.
 The Visperad, a collection of supplements to the Yasna.
 The Yashts, hymns in honor of the divinities.
 The Vendidad, describes the various forms of evil spirits and ways to confound them.
 shorter texts and prayers, the Yashts the five Nyaishes ("worship, praise"), the Sirozeh and the Afringans (blessings).

There are some 60 secondary religious texts, none of which are considered scripture. The most important of these are:
 The Denkard (Middle Persian, 'Acts of Religion'),
 The Bundahishn, (Middle Persian, 'Primordial Creation')
 The Menog-i Khrad, (Middle Persian, 'Spirit of Wisdom')
 The Arda Viraf Namak (Middle Persian, 'The Book of Arda Viraf')
 The  (modern Persian, 'Hundred Doors', or 'Hundred Chapters')
 The Rivayats, 15th–18th century correspondence on religious issues

For general use by the laity:
 The Zend, various commentaries on and translations of the Avesta.
 The Khordeh Avesta, Zoroastrian prayer book for lay people from the Avesta.

Yarsanism 

 Kalâm-e Saranjâm

Yazidi 

The true core texts of the Yazidi religion that exist today are the hymns, known as qawls. Spurious examples of so-called "Yazidi religious texts" include the Yazidi Black Book and the Yazidi Book of Revelation, which are believed to have been forged in the early 20th century; the Yazidi Black Book, for instance, is thought to be a combination of genuine Yazidi beliefs and Western forgeries.

Indian religions

Ayyavazhi 

Akilattirattu Ammanai:
 Akilam one
 Akilam two
 Akilam three
 Akilam four
 Akilam five
 Akilam six
 Akilam seven
 Akilam eight
 Akilam nine
 Akilam ten
 Akilam eleven
 Akilam twelve
 Akilam thirteen
 Akilam fourteen
 Akilam fifteen
 Akilam sixteen
 Akilam seventeen
Arul Nool:
 Ukappadippu
 Pothippu
 Ucchippadippu
 Saattu Neettolai
 Nadutheervai Ula
 Panchadevar Urppatthi
 Patthiram
 Sivakanta Athikarappatthiram
 Thingal patham
 Saptha Kannimar Padal
 Kalyana Vazhthu

Buddhism 

Theravada Buddhism:
 The Tipitaka or Pāli Canon
 Vinaya Pitaka
 Suttavibhaṅga: Pāṭimokkha and commentary
 Mahāvibhaṅga: rules for monks
 Bhikkhunīvibhaṅga: rules for nuns
 Khandhaka: 22 chapters on various topics
 Parivāra: analyses of rules from various points of view
 Sutta Pitaka
 Digha Nikaya, the "long" discourses (including Brahmajāla Sutta, Samaññaphala Sutta, Sigālovāda Sutta and Mahāparinibbāṇa Sutta)
 Majjhima Nikaya, the "middle-length" discourses (including Ānāpānasati Sutta and Sammādiṭṭhi Sutta)
 Samyutta Nikaya, the "connected" discourses (including Ādittapariyāya Sutta, Dhammacakkappavattana Sutta & Anattalakkhaṇa Sutta)
 Anguttara Nikaya, the "numerical" discourses (including Dīghajāṇu Sutta)
 Khuddaka Nikaya, the "minor collection" (including Dhammapada, Udāna, Itivuttaka, Sutta Nipāta, Theragatha and Therīgāthā)
 Abhidhamma Pitaka
 Dhammasaṅganī ( or )
 Vibhaṅga
 Dhātukathā (dhātukathā)
 Puggalapaññatti (-paññatti)
 Kathāvatthu (kathā-)
 Yamaka
 Paṭṭhāna (paţţhāna)

East Asian Mahayana:
 The Chinese Buddhist Mahayana sutras, including
 Diamond Sutra and the Heart Sutra
 Shurangama Sutra and its Shurangama Mantra
 Great Compassion Mantra
 Pure Land Buddhism
 Infinite Life Sutra
 Amitabha Sutra
 Contemplation Sutra
 other Pure Land Sutras
 Tiantai, Tendai, and Nichiren
 Lotus Sutra
 Shingon
 Mahavairocana Sutra
 Vajrasekhara Sutra

Tibetan Buddhism:
 Tibetan Kangyur and Tengyur

Hinduism 

Śruti:
 The Four Vedas
 Rig Veda
 Sama Veda
 Yajur Veda
 Atharva Veda
 Samhitas (Mantras, Prayers)
 Brahmanas (Commentaries, Instructions)
 Aranyakas (Meditation, Rituals)
 Upanishads (Essence, Wisdom)

Smriti:
 Itihāsas
 Mahābhārata (including the Bhagavad Gita)
 Bhagavad Gita
 Ramayana
 Puranas (List)
 Bhagavata Purana
 Tantras
 Sutras (List)
 Stotras
 Ashtavakra Gita
 Gherand Samhita
 Gita Govinda
 Hatha Yoga Pradipika
 Yoga Vasistha

In Purva Mimamsa:
 Purva Mimamsa Sutras

In Vedanta (Uttar Mimamsa):
 Brahma Sutras of Vyasa

In Yoga:
 Yoga Sutras of Patanjali

In Samkhya:
 Samkhya Sutras of Kapila

In Nyaya:
 Nyāya Sūtras of Gautama

In Vaisheshika:
 Vaisheshika Sutras of Kanada

In Vaishnavism:
 Vaikhanasa Samhitas
 Pancaratra Samhitas
 Divyaprabandha

In Saktism:
 Sakta Tantras

In Kashmir Saivism:
 64 Bhairavagamas
 28 Shaiva Agamas
 Shiva Sutras of Vasugupta
 Vijnana Bhairava Tantra

In Pashupata Shaivism:
 Pashupata-sutra of Lakulisha
 Panchartha-bhashya of Kaundinya (a commentary on the Pashupata Sutras)
 Ganakarika
 Ratnatika of Bhasarvajna

In Shaiva Siddhanta:
 28 Saiva Agamas
 Tirumurai (canon of 12 works)
 Meykandar Shastras (canon of 14 works)

In Gaudiya Vaishnavism:
 Brahma Samhita
 Jayadeva's Gita Govinda

Krishna-karnamrita:
 Chaitanya Bhagavata
 Chaitanya Charitamrita
 Prema-bhakti-candrika
 Hari-bhakti-vilasa

In Lingayatism:
 Siddhanta Shikhamani
 Vachana sahitya
 Mantra Gopya
 Shoonya Sampadane
 28 Agamas
 Karana Hasuge
 Basava purana

In Kabir Panth:
 poems of Kabir

In Dadu Panth:
 poems of Dadu

Jainism 

Svetambara:
 11 Angas
 Secondary
 12 Upangas, 4 Mula-sutras, 6 Cheda-sutras, 2 Culika-sutras, 10 Prakirnakas

Digambara:
 Samaysara
 Pravachanasara
 Niyamsara
 Pancastikayasara
 Karmaprabhrita, also called Satkhandagama
 Kashayaprabhrita

Nonsectarian/Nonspecific:
 Jina Vijaya
 Tattvartha Sutra
 GandhaHasti Mahabhashya (authoritative and oldest commentary on the Tattvartha Sutra)
 Four Anuyogas (the four vedas of Jainism)

Ravidassia 

Amritbani Guru Ravidass Ji, the holy book contains the following hymns: Raga – Siri (1), Gauri (5), Asa (6), Gujari (1), Sorath (7), Dhanasari (3), Jaitsari (1), Suhi (3), Bilaval (2), Gaund (2), Ramkali (1), Maru (2), Kedara (1), Bhairau (1), Basant (1), and Malhar (3). The book contains 140 shabads, 40 pade, and 231 salok. There are 177 pages in all of the book.

Sikhism 

 Guru Granth Sahib
 Dasam Granth
 Sarbloh Granth

Satpanth 

 Ginans
 Dua (prayers)

Abrahamic religions

Bahá'í Faith 

 Writings of the Báb
Persian Bayán
Arabic Bayán
Writings of the Báb
 Writings of Bahá'u'lláh, 
Kitáb-i-Aqdas – The Most Holy Book
Kitáb-i-Íqán – The Book of Certitude
The Hidden Words
Days of Remembrance
Epistle to the Son of the Wolf
The Four Valleys
Gems of Divine Mysteries
Gleanings
Kitáb-i-Badí'
The Seven Valleys
Summons of the Lord of Hosts
Tabernacle of Unity
Tablets of Bahá'u'lláh
 Writings and Talks of 'Abdu'l‑Bahá
Some Answered Questions
Tablets of the Divine Plan
The Secret of Divine Civilization
Paris Talks
Will and Testament
 Writings of Shoghi Effendi
Advent of Divine Justice
Bahá'í Administration
God Passes By
World Order of Bahá'u'lláh
 Messages and writings of the Universal House of Justice
 The scripture of previous world religions

Christianity

Bible 

The contents of Christian Bibles differ by denomination.

 The Canon of Trent defines a canonical list of books of the Catholic Bible that includes the whole 73-book canon recognized by the Catholic Church, including the deuterocanonical books. (In versions of the Latin Vulgate, 3 Esdras, 4 Esdras, and the Prayer of Manasseh are included in an appendix, but considered non-canonical, and are not included in modern Catholic Bibles).
 Most Protestant Bibles include the Hebrew Bible's 24 books (the protocanonical books) divided differently (into 39 books) and the 27-book New Testament for a total of 66 books. Some denominations (e.g. Anglicanism) also include the 14 books of the biblical apocrypha between the Old Testament and the New Testament, for a total of 80 books.
 Greek and Eastern Orthodox Bibles include the anagignoskomena, which consist of the Catholic deuterocanon, plus 3 Maccabees, Psalm 151, the Prayer of Manasseh, and 3 Esdras; The Fourth Book of Maccabees is considered to be canonical by the Georgian Orthodox Church. The Septuagint, the Greek translation of the Old Testament, is authoritative.
 The Church of the East includes most of the deuterocanonical books of the Old Testament which are found in the Peshitta (The Syriac Version of the Bible). The New Testament in modern versions contains the 5 disputed books (2 Peter, 2 John, 3 John, Jude, and Revelation) that were originally excluded.
 In Oriental Orthodoxy, the biblical canon differs in each Patriarchate.
 The Armenian Apostolic Orthodox Church has at various times included a variety of books in the New Testament which are not included in the canons of other traditions.
 The Ethiopian Orthodox Tewahedo Church (and its daughter, the Eritrean Orthodox Church) accept various books according to either of the Narrower or the Broader Canons but always include the entire Catholic deuterocanon, the Prayer of Manasseh, 3 Ezra, 4 Ezra, and The Book of Josippon. They may also include the Book of Jubilees, Book of Enoch, 1 Baruch, 4 Baruch, as well as 1, 2, and 3 Meqabyan (no relation to the Books of Maccabees). The New Testament contains the Sinodos, the Books of the Covenant, Clement, and the Didascalia.
 Some Syrian Churches, regardless of whether they are Eastern Catholic, Nestorian, Oriental or Eastern Orthodox, accept the Letter of Baruch as scripture.
 Some early Quakers also included the Epistle to the Laodiceans.

Additional and alternative scriptures 
Some Christian denominations have additional or alternate holy scriptures, some with authoritativeness similar to the Old Testament and New Testament.
 The Unification Church includes the Divine Principle in its holy scriptures.
 Gnostic Christianity rejected the narrative in Pauline Christianity that the arrival of Jesus had to do with the forgiveness of sins, and instead were concerned with illusion and enlightenment. Gnostic texts include Gnostic gospels about the life of Jesus, books attributed to various apostles, apocalyptic writings, and philosophical works. Though there is some overlap with some New Testament works, the rest were eventually considered heretical by Christian orthodoxy. Gnostics generally did not include the Old Testament as canon. They believed in two gods, one of which was Yahweh (generally considered evil), the author of the Hebrew Bible and god of the Jews, separate from a Supreme God who sent Jesus.
 Marcion's canon included only the Gospel of Marcion and a set of Pauline epistles which overlap with the canon of orthodox Pauline Christianity. His gospel was a version of the Gospel of Luke that did not contain any references to the Old Testament.
 The Cainites apparently used the Gospel of Judas.

Latter Day Saint movement

 The Protestant Bible
 The Church of Jesus Christ of Latter-day Saints (LDS Church) uses the LDS edition of the King James Bible for English-speaking members; other versions are used in non-English speaking countries. The Community of Christ (RLDS) uses the Joseph Smith Translation, which it calls the Inspired Version, as well as updated modern translations, mainly the NRSV.
 The Book of Mormon
 The Doctrine and Covenants. There are significant differences in content and section numbering between the Doctrine and Covenants used by the Community of Christ (RLDS) and the LDS Church.
 The Pearl of Great Price is authoritative in the LDS Church, rejected by Community of Christ.
 Other, smaller branches of Latter Day Saints include other scriptures such as:
 Lectures on Faith recognized in canon of Fundamentalists and some Prairie Saints.
 The Book of the Law of the Lord used by the Church of Jesus Christ of Latter Day Saints (Strangite). This sect likewise holds as scriptural several prophecies, visions, revelations, and translations printed by James Strang, and published in the Revelations of James J. Strang.
 The Word of the Lord and The Word of the Lord Brought to Mankind by an Angel used by Fettingite branches.

Liturgical books 
Liturgical books are used to guide or script worship, and many are specific to a denomination.

Catholic liturgical books:
 Books of the clergy
 The Roman Missal (The pope, archbishops, bishops, priests and deacons editions)
 The Book of the Gospels (evangeliary/evangelion)
 The Lectionary
 Sacramentary (for bishops and priests)
 Pontifical (for bishops)
 Cæremoniale Episcoporum (for bishops)
 Breviary (Hours/Divine Office)
 Gradual (Roman gradual, antiphonal, cantatory)
 Liber Usualis (Book of Common Use/Gregorian chants)
 Roman Ritual (baptism, benedictions, blessings, burials, exorcisms, etc.)
 Roman Martyrology (saints/The blessed)
 Books of church attendants:
 Missal (pew cyclical editions)
 Missalette (pew seasonal editions)
 Hymnal (pew hymnbook editions)

Protestant liturgical books:
 Anglicanism:
 Book of Common Prayer (BCP) 1549
 Lutheranism:
 Evangelical Lutheran Hymn-Book (ELHB) 1912
 The Lutheran Hymnal (TLH) 1941
 Lutheran Book of Prayer (LBP) 1941
 Lutheran Service Book and Hymnal (SBH) 1958
 Lutheran Book of Worship (LBW) 1978
 Lutheran Worship (LW) 1982
 Evangelical Lutheran Worship (ELW) 2006
 Lutheran Service Book (LSB) 2006
 Numerous hymn, service and guide books (varies by church)
 Methodism:
 The Sunday Service of the Methodists
 Book of Worship for Church and Home (1965)
 The Book of Hymns
 The United Methodist Hymnal (United Methodist Church)
 The United Methodist Book of Worship (1992) (United Methodist Church)
 Book of Discipline (United Methodist) (John Wesley-1784, United Methodist Church-2016)
 Numerous hymn, service and guide books (varies by church)
 Southern Baptists:
 Baptist Hymnal
 Numerous hymn, service and guide books (varies by church)

Doctrines and laws 

Various Christian denominations have texts which define the doctrines of the group or set out laws which are considered binding. The groups consider these to range in permanence from unquestionable interpretations of divine revelations to human decisions made for convenience or elucidation which are subject to reconsideration.

 Doctrines such as the Trinity, the virgin birth and atonement
 The Ten Commandments, also known in Christianity as the Decalogue, are a set of biblical principles relating to ethics and worship.
 The distinctive Calvinist doctrine of "double" predestination.
 In Catholicism, the concept of Magisterium reserves matters of religious interpretation to the church, with various levels of infallibility expressed in various documents.
 Infallibility of the Church is applied to:
 In the Catholic Church, papal infallibility of a very small number of papal decrees. Most documents produced by the Pope, including the Catechism of the Catholic Church are considered subject to revision.
 To the decisions of ecumenical councils in Catholic, some Orthodox, and some Protestant denominations, though the non-Catholic denominations only accept certain councils as genuinely ecumenical.
 The Salvation Army Handbook of Doctrine
 Transubstantiation and Marian teachings in Roman Catholic theology. The department of the Roman Curia which deals with questions of doctrine is called the Congregation for the Doctrine of the Faith.
 The Christian Science textbook Science and Health with Key to the Scriptures by Mary Baker Eddy, along with the Bible, serves as the permanent "impersonal pastor" of the Church of Christ, Scientist.
 The Methodist Church of Great Britain refers to the "doctrines to which the preachers of the Methodist Church are pledged" as doctrinal standards.
 Seventh-day Adventists hold the writings of Ellen White are held to an elevated status, though not equal with the Bible, as she is considered to have been an inspired prophetess.
 Swedenborgianism is defined by the Biblical interpretations of Emanuel Swedenborg starting with Arcana Cœlestia.
 H. Emilie Cady's 1896 Lessons in Truth, A Course of Twelve Lessons in Practical Christianity is considered a core text of the Unity Church.

Druze 

 Quran
  (Epistles of Wisdom)

Islam 

The five universally acknowledged messengers in Islam are Abraham, Moses, David, Jesus and Muhammad, each believed to have been sent with a scripture. Muslims believe David (Dāwūd) received Psalms (cf. Q38:28); Jesus (Īsā) the Gospel; Muhammad received the Qur'an; Abraham (Ibrahim) the Scrolls of Abraham; and Moses (Mūsā) the Torah.

Sunni Islam 

 Quran
 Hadith books (Kutub al-Sittah):
 Sahih Al-Bukhari
 Sahih Muslim
 Jami' at-Tirmidhi
 Sunan Abu Dawood
 Al-Sunan al-Sughra (Sunan an-Nasa'i)
 Sunan ibn Majah
 Other Hadith books:
 Muwatta Imam Malik
 Musnad Ahmad ibn Hanbal
 Sunan al-Kubra
 The Meadows of the Righteous (Riyadh al-saliheen)
 Bulugh al-Maram
 Musannaf of Abd al-Razzaq
 Sunan al-Daraqutni
 Sahih Ibn Hibban
 Sunan al-Darimi
 Musnad al-Shafi'i
 Musnad Abu Hanifa 
 Sahih ibn Khuzaima
 Musnad Tayalisi
 Musnad al-Bazzar
 Musnad Abi Ya'la 
 Musnad Rahwayh 
 Musnad ibn Humayd 
 Musnad al-Firdous
 Tahdhib al-Athar
 Al-Mu'jam al-Awsat
 Al-Mu'jam as-Saghir
 Majma al-Zawa'id
 Kanz al-Ummal
 Shuab ul Iman
 Sharh Ma'anir Athar
 Sharh Mushkīlil Athar 
 Silsilah Sahiha
 Mishkat al-Masabih
 Al-Adab al-Mufrad
 Sahih Hadith Kudsi
 Shama'il Muhammadiyah
 At-Targhib wat-Tarhib

Shia Islam 

 Quran
 Nahj al Balagha
 Al Sahiyfa al Sajadiyya
 Hadith books (The Four Books): Kitab al-Kafi, Man La Yahduruhu al-Faqih	Tahdhib al-Ahkam, Al-Istibsar.
 Other Hadith books (discourses of Prophet Muhammad and his household), like Bihar al-Anwar, Awalim al-Ulum; and Tafsirs, such as Tafsir al-Burhan and there is more than fifty large and small Hadith books
 Prayer books and Ziyarat such as Mafateh al Jinan and Kamel al Ziyarat.
 Books on biography of Prophet Muhammad. There are thousands of biographies written, though unlike the Hadith collections, they are usually not accepted as canonical religious texts. Some of the more authentic and famous of them are:
 Al-Sira Al-Nabawiyya.
 The Making of the last prophet by Ibn Ishaq
 The Life of Prophet Muhammad by Ibn Ishaq
 Sira Manzuma.
 al-Mawahib al-Ladunniya.
 al-Zurqani 'ala al-Mawahib.
 Sirah al-Halabiyya.
 I'lam al-Nubuwwa.
 Madarij al-Nubuwwa.
 Shawahid al-Nubuwwa.
 Nur al-Safir.
 Sharh al-Mawahib al-laduniyya.
 al-Durar fi ikhtisar al-maghazi was-siyar.
 Ashraf al-wasa'il ila faham al-Shama'il.
 Ghayat al-sul fi Khasa'is al-Rasul.
 Ithbat al-Nubuwwa.
 Nihaya al-Sul fi Khasa'is al-Rasul.
 Al Khasais-ul-Kubra, al-Khasa'is al-Sughra and Shama'il al-Sharifa.
 al-Durra al-Mudiyya.

Alawites 

 Quran
 Kitab al Majmu
 Other 114 canonical scriptures such as (Kitab ul Asus by an ancient prophet) and the other 113 scriptures were authored by imam Ali, imam Ja'far al-Sadiq, the 11th Bab Ibn Nusayr and the medieval sages of the sect such as Al-Khasibi.

Ahmadiyya 

 Quran
 Hadith (Sunni corpus)
 Rūhānī Khazā᾽in, collected writings of Mirza Ghulam Ahmad (23 volumes)
 Malfūzāt, the Discourses of Ghulam Ahmad (10 volumes)
 Tafsīr-e-Kabīr, 10-volume Quranic commentary by Mirza Bashir al-Din Mahmud Ahmad

Alevism 

 Quran
 Nahj al-Balagha
 Buyruks
 
 Vilayetname
 Akhiratnama

Mevlevi Order

 Quran
 Masnavi
 Fihi Ma Fihi
 Diwan-e Shams-e Tabrizi

Judaism

Rabbinic Judaism 

 The Tanakh i.e. Hebrew Bible
 Torah (teachings)
 Nevi'im (prophets)
 Ketuvim (writings)
 The Talmud
 Mishnah
 Tosefta
 Gemara
 The Midrash

Haymanot 

 The Tanakh with several Jewish apocrypha

Kabbalism 
 Kabbalah: Primary texts
 Zohar

Non-rabbinic Judaism

Karaite Judaism 

 The Tanakh

Jewish Science 

 The Tanakh
 Jewish Science: Divine Healing in Judaism

Rastafari movement 

 The Bible (Ethiopian Orthodox canon)
 the Holy Piby
 the Kebra Nagast
 The speeches and writings of Haile Selassie I (including his autobiography My Life and Ethiopia's Progress)
 Royal Parchment Scroll of Black Supremacy

Samaritanism 

 Samaritan Torah

Pre-Columbian Americas

Aztec religion 

 The Borgia Group codices

Maya religion 

 The Popol Vuh
 the Dresden Codex
 the Madrid Codex
 the Paris Codex

Ethnic religions

Bon (autochthonous religious tradition of Tibet) 

 Bön Kangyur and Tengyur

Old Norse religion 

 Poetic Edda
 Prose Edda

Kiratism 

 The Mundhum of the Limbu ethnic group

Shabakism 

 Buyruk (Shabak)

Qizilbash 

 Buyruks of Qizilbash
 Fetevatnameh

Yorùbá 

 Odù Ifá
 Jaap Verduijn's Odu Ifa Collection

New religious movements

Ayyavazhi 

 The Akilathirattu Ammanai
 The Arul Nool

The ACIM Movement 
 A Course in Miracles

The writings of Franklin Albert Jones  Adi Da Love-Ananda Samraj 
 Aletheon
 The Companions of the True Dawn Horse
 The Dawn Horse Testament
 Gnosticon
 The Heart of the Adi Dam Revelation
 Not-Two IS Peace
 Pneumaton
 Transcendental Realism

Aetherius Society 

 The Nine Freedoms

Caodaism 

  (Prayers of the Heavenly and the Earthly Way) 
  (The Religious Constitution of Caodaism)
  (The Canonical Codes)
  (Compilation of Divine Messages)

Cheondoism 

 The Donghak Scripture
 The Songs of Yongdam
 The Sermons of Master Haeweol
 The Sermons of Revered Teacher Euiam

Creativity Movement 

The writings of Ben Klassen:
 Nature's Eternal Religion
 The White Man's Bible
 Salubrious Living

Discordianism 

 The Principia Discordia

Druidry 

 The Mabinogion
 Lebor Gabála Érenn
 Barddas

Dudeism 

 The Dude De Ching
 Duderonomy

Heathenry 

 Edda

Jediism 

 Aionomica
 Rammahgon

Konkokyo 

 Oshirase-Goto Obobe-Chō
 Konko Daijin Oboegaki
 Gorikai I
 Gorikai II
 Gorikai III

Meher Baba 

 God Speaks
 Discourses

Meivazhi 

 The four vedas of Meivazhi
 Āti mey utaya pūrana veētāntam
 Āntavarkal mānmiyam
 Eman pātar atipatu tiru meyññanak koral
 Eman pātar atipatu kotāyūtak kūr

Oahspe Faithism 
 Oahspe: A New Bible

Pastafarianism 

 The Gospel of the Flying Spaghetti Monster

Raëlism 

The writings of Raël  Claude Vorilhon:
 Intelligent Design: Message from the Designers
 Sensual Meditation
 Yes to Human Cloning

Ravidassia 

 The Amritbani Guru Ravidass Ji

Religious Science 

 The Science of Mind by Ernest Holmes

Satanism 

 The Satanic Bible
 The Satanic Rituals
 The Satanic Scriptures

Scientology 

 Dianetics: The Modern Science of Mental Health
 List of Scientology texts

Spiritism 

 The Spirits Book
 The Book on Mediums
 The Gospel According to Spiritism
 Heaven and Hell
 The Genesis According to Spiritism

Tenrikyo 

 The Ofudesaki
 The Mikagura-uta
 The Osashizu

Thelema 

 The Holy Books of Thelema, especially The Book of the Law

Unarius Academy of Science 

 The Pulse of Creation Series
 The Infinite Concept of Cosmic Creation

Urantianism 

 The Urantia Book

Wicca 

 Book of Shadows
 Charge of the Goddess
 Threefold Law
 Wiccan Rede

See also
 List of religions and spiritual traditions

External links 
Religious full text online library
Internet Sacred Text Archive

Notes

References

 
Text
Text